
John Snyder may refer to:

Politics
 John Snyder (Pennsylvania politician) (1793–1850), American politician from Pennsylvania
 J. Buell Snyder (1877–1946), American  politician from Pennsylvania
 John Wesley Snyder (1895–1985), American business manager & government administrator
 John Snyder (Florida politician) (born 1987), American politician in the Florida House of Representatives
 John M. Snyder, American gun lobbyist

Sports
 John Snyder (baseball) (born 1974), American baseball player
 Jack Snyder (baseball) (John William Snyder, 1886–1981), American baseball player

Other
 John Otterbein Snyder (1867–1943), American zoologist
 John J. Snyder (1925-2019), American Roman Catholic bishop
 John P. Snyder (1926–1997), American cartographer
 John Snyder (actor) (born 1952), American actor
 John K. Snyder III, comic artist
 John T. Snyder, American games artist

See also 
 Jack Snyder (disambiguation)
 Jonathan Snyder (disambiguation)
 John Schneider (disambiguation)